Jotedars, also known as  Haoladars, Ganitdars or Mandals, were "wealthy peasants" who comprised one layer of social strata in agrarian Bengal during Company rule in India. Jotedars owned relatively extensive tracts of land; their land tenure status stood in contrast to those of under-ryots and bargadars (sharecroppers), who were landless or land-poors. Many jotedars were bhadraloks  (upper caste members) who adopted the de jure status of ryot (peasant) solely for the financial benefit that the Bengal Tenancy Act of 1885 afforded to ryots. Others belonged to the intermediate landowning peasant castes such as Sadgops, Aguris,
Mahishyas, Rajbongshis, Shershahabadia and the rural, less educated Brahmins. By the 1920s a gentrified fraction of Jotedars emerged from the more prosperous peasants among the tribes such as Santhals and the Scheduled Castes such as the Bagdi and the Namasudras

Jotedars were pitted against in the Naxalite movement.

References 

Bengal Presidency
Indian feudalism
History of agriculture in India
British East India Company